John O. Underman (August 17, 1925 – October 23, 1969) was an American basketball player. Underman was selected in the 1947 BAA draft by the St. Louis Bombers after a collegiate career at Ohio State (OSU), although he never played professionally. Underman went to West High School in Columbus prior to choosing hometown OSU for college. He led the Big Nine Conference in scoring as a junior in 1945–46, the same season the Buckeyes made the NCAA Final Four and won the Third Place game.

Underman then became an oral surgeon. He died in a car crash on October 23, 1969, at age 44.

References

1925 births
1969 deaths
American dentists
American men's basketball players
Basketball players from Ohio
Centers (basketball)
Ohio State Buckeyes men's basketball players
People from Elyria, Ohio
Road incident deaths in Ohio
St. Louis Bombers (NBA) draft picks
20th-century dentists